The Ginetta G40 is a sports car which has been built by Ginetta Cars since 2010. It is available in two versions; a road-going version, named the G40R, and the race version, the G40, which is available in two specifications; one of which is the G40 Challenge, the other is the G40 Junior, which were designed for the Ginetta GT5 Challenge and the Ginetta Junior Championship respectively. The G40 replaced the Ginetta G20 race car, and also replaced the road version of the Ginetta G50.

Race versions
The Ginetta G40 Challenge was introduced in 2010, supplementing the Ginetta G20 in the one-make Ginetta GT5 Challenge. The car was available in 2010 for £24,950, plus VAT, and featured 280mm discs all round. The engine in the most recent versions generate , and weigh , using 6-speed Quaife sequential gearboxes. It received Autosport's National Car of the Year Award for 2010, two years after the G50 had received the same award.

In addition to the Ginetta Junior Championship, the G40 has been entered in the Britcar series. In the latter series, it won its class at the Britcar 24 Hours, held at the Silverstone Circuit on its debut in 2010, and finished 12th overall, driven by the works Team LNT team's drivers Lawrence Tomlinson, Mike Simpson, Steve Linn and Nigel Moore, also proving to be the fastest Ginetta, as it finished one place ahead of a GT4-class Ginetta G50. At the 2011 edition of the race, the top G40 finished 26th overall, and fourth in class; this time entered by Rollcentre Racing, and driven by Richard Skyes, Jake Rattenbury, Brian Saunders and Mark Davies. In 2012, a G40 once again finished 12th overall, and fourth in class; this time, driven by Piranha Motorsport's Simon Mason, Rory Bryant, Ryan Ratcliffe and Chris Bialan.

Ginetta also built a less powerful variant of the G40, named the G40 Junior. This utilizes a restricted  version of the 1.8-litre Zetec engine, to comply with MSA regulations, and was used in the Ginetta Junior Championship (replacing the G20), a series for 14 to 17-year old drivers that is part of the British Touring Car Championship's support package. Initially run on Michelin Pilot Cup tyres, which were treaded, the series moved to slick tyres for 2012, only to revert to treaded tyres for 2013.

Road version

In 2010, Ginetta decided to cancel plans to produce a road-going version of the bigger Ginetta G50, and instead built a road-going variant of the G40, named the G40R. Ginetta claim a fuel economy figure of 29 mpg, and carbon dioxide emissions of 181g/km. Prices started at £29,950. Autocar gave the car a rating of 4 out of 5; praising the car's engine note and driving feel, but criticizing it for inconsistent steering weight and for an unfinished cabin. What Car? gave the car a rating of 3 out of 5, praising its performance and handling, but criticizing its lack of safety features, its poor refinement, and its lack of equipment. The Telegraph gave the car 4 out of 5 stars, praising its driving feel, but criticizing the body's finish. Auto Express gave the car 3 out of 5, praising its on-track behaviour, but stating that it wasn't really suited to everyday usage. Ginetta planned to sell 100 cars annually.

See also
Ginetta GT5 Challenge
Ginetta Junior Championship

References

Ginetta vehicles
Cars introduced in 2010
Sports cars
2010s cars